Bruce Ferguson (born Suva, 25 July 1969) is a former Fijian-born Japanese rugby union player. He played as a lock.

Career
His first international cap for Japan was against Wales, at the Cardiff Arms Park, on October 16, 1993. He was part of the 1995 Rugby World Cup roster, where he played four matches. His last cap was against Canada, at Vancouver, on July 13, 1996.
He played also for Hino Motors and then, Kobe Steel in the Top League.

Notes

References
Bruce Ferguson international statistics

1969 births
Living people
Fijian rugby union players
Japanese rugby union players
Rugby union locks
Fijian expatriates in Japan
Japan international rugby union players
Sportspeople from Suva
Japan international rugby sevens players